Robotech II: The Sentinels was an attempt by Harmony Gold USA to continue the original 1985 Robotech television series. Only three episodes were ultimately animated before the project was canceled in 1986, and a feature-length film was released from footage taken from the completed episodes. The aborted 65-episode Sentinels series would have followed the ongoing adventures of Rick Hunter and Lisa Hayes and the rest of the Robotech Expeditionary Force (REF) during the events of The Robotech Masters and The New Generation series.

Background

The feature-length pilot is composed of the first three (and only) episodes that were produced for the series. It introduces the SDF-3, along with its crew, and gives an overview of their new mission. The title refers to the Sentinels, an alien resistance movement encountered by the Robotech Expeditionary Force (REF) that consists of races subjugated by the Robotech Masters or the Invid. The significant events in the film include Lin Minmei making peace with Admiral Lisa Hayes well enough to sing at her wedding to Major General Rick Hunter and the Invid's brutal invasion of the Robotech Masters homeworld of Tirol.

Being a sequel/spinoff to the combined series, The Sentinels featured characters from all three Robotech sagas, including Rick Hunter, Lisa Hayes (later Lisa Hayes-Hunter), Max Sterling, Miriya Parina Sterling, Exedore and Breetai from The Macross Saga, Dana Sterling, Bowie Grant, and a couple of their superiors from Masters, in addition to Jonathan Wolff and the Invid Regis of The New Generation (Scott Bernard was also planned, though never appeared in the confines of the feature). Among the newly created characters were young cadet rivals Jack Baker and Karen Penn, whose early love-hate relationship mirrored Rick and Lisa's; Vince Grant, brother of Claudia Grant, and father of Bowie Grant; and the Invid Regent, the villainous leader of the Invid. Dr. Emil Lang, a supporting character in the Macross Saga, would return as a main character. The story also introduces a human adversary in the form of T. R. Edwards, who was first introduced in Comico's Robotech: The Graphic Novel.

Storyline
The Pioneer Expedition was a mission to confront alien forces in space to prevent interplanetary war on Earth. It took place concurrently with the 2nd and 3rd Robotech wars. The expedition was led by Lisa Hayes aboard the SDF-3, which was launched in 2022 in search of the Robotech Masters. The mission soon became preoccupied with the liberation of worlds under the control of the Invid Regent. In June 2030, the final battle of the Second Robotech War caused a release of the spores of the Invid flower of life across Earth, which soon attracted the Invid. In 2031, the Invid, under the control of the Regis, invaded Earth. The United Earth Forces (including the elite Army of the Southern Cross) had been severely weakened by the Second Robotech War and were only able to offer limited resistance. In less than a week, the Invid seized control of the planet and began utilizing the human population for slave labour and scientific experiments. In 2038 and 2042, the REF sent the 10th and 21st Mars divisions to try to retake the planet, but both ended in complete failure. It was only with the third attempt in 2044, which involved all available REF forces (now equipped with new technology known as new Reflex Weapons and Shadow Techno Fighters obtained from the Haydonites) that the Invid were dislodged from Earth.

Production history
The Tatsunoko Production animation studio assigned the first script drafts to writers Sukehiro Tomita (Macross, Mospeada) and Hiroshi Ohnogi (Macross). According to director Carl Macek, the Japanese animators initially tried to relate the project to the original versions of Macross, Southern Cross, and Mospeada, until Harmony Gold explained the differences made in Robotechs adaptation with diagrams and charts. When the animators focused on new characters instead of Rick Hunter and the other characters derived from the original Macross series, Macek ended up reassigning the scriptwriting to American writers, headed by script supervisor Kent Butterworth to refocus the project.

Upon viewing the completed animation, Macek felt that scenes featuring new characters (such as Jack Baker, Karen Penn and The Invid Regent) had received much more care and attention by the animators than those with the original Macross characters (Rick Hunter, Lisa Hunter, Max Sterling). Macek believed that Tatsunoko secretly intended to re-use this higher-quality footage for a Japan-only sequel to Genesis Climber MOSPEADA - one of the Japanese series that had been adapted into the original Robotech series.

Mechanical designers 
 Studio Ammonite (Hiroshi Ogawa , Hiroshi Okura , and Takashi Ono.)

Cancellation
Macek blamed the cancellation of the series on the crash of the Dollar/Yen exchange rate in the mid-1980s, which caused toy partner Matchbox to withdraw from the project due to the increased cost. Since Harmony Gold lacked the funds to produce the series on its own, production ceased after only three episodes.

Home video release 
Macek collected the usable footage from the aborted Sentinels project into a feature film that was first released on VHS in September 1988 by Robotech Role-Playing Game publisher Palladium Books. Macek's own Streamline Pictures released it again in 1992.

The Sentinels feature was included on DVD as an extra with the third volume of the Robotech Legacy Collection and the complete Protoculture Collection, from ADV Films. The disc includes the option of a voiceover commentary by Macek (mostly read directly from the comprehensive Robotech Art 3: The Sentinels), in which he discusses some of the aspects of the production.

In 2011, a "remastered" version was released on the A&E DVD set, Robotech: The Complete Original Series. This version has opening titles resembling those found on the Robotech Remastered DVDs, as well as a new ending with text explaining the fate of the SDF-3. Also, all of the flashback footage used from "The Macross Saga" has been removed, along with re-used footage from the episode "Wedding Bells."

Adaptations
Despite its cancellation, Harmony Gold provided the unfinished Sentinels source material for adaptation by several different parties, resulting in several different versions of the same continuity. Macek's original outline and notes for the series were published by Comico as Robotech Art 3: The Sentinels.

Novelizations

In 1988, author Jack McKinney completed a series of novels of the Sentinels storyline, released in paperback.

 Robotech #13 - The Sentinels: The Devil's Hand
 Robotech #14 - The Sentinels: Dark Powers
 Robotech #15 - The Sentinels: Death Dance
 Robotech #16 - The Sentinels: World Killers
 Robotech #17 - The Sentinels: Rubicon

Robotech #18 - The End of the Circle (1989), although not technically a Sentinels novel, did wrap up all of the outstanding issues from both the Sentinels and the first 12 books.

Comics

The Waltrip brothers adapted the novels into comic books, though they diverged from the novels as the story progressed. The Sentinels comics were published by Eternity Comics, then Academy Comics. The storyline abruptly ended when Academy was unable to renew their license with Harmony Gold. The comics license passed to Antarctic Press, who published The Sentinels: Rubicon, which draws its name from the title of the fifth Sentinels novel. However, the Rubicon comic, instead of completing the Sentinels story, is set years after the end of the Sentinels Campaign, and was not illustrated by the Waltrips. It was not popular with fans, due to the poor artwork and the lack of connection to The Sentinels. It was cancelled after only two issues.

The Waltrips returned in 2005 to adapt elements of the last McKinney Sentinels novel into Robotech: Prelude to the Shadow Chronicles, a comic book miniseries which also serves as a prequel to the animated 2006 feature film Robotech: The Shadow Chronicles. This prelude miniseries, while picking up roughly where the previous Sentinels comics ended, also acknowledges the official 2003 rebooting of the Robotech universe. While the events of Sentinels are still seen to have happened, it is now agreed that certain events and situations have been retconned both before and during the events in Prelude.

Role-playing game
Palladium Books had published an role-playing game called Robotech in 1986 that was based on the original anime television series. The following year, with the new Sentinels storyline, Palladium adapted the Sentinels material — and the move away from Earth and into deep space — into its Robotech II: The Sentinels role-playing game.

References

External links

Robotech Timeline - Sentinels at Robotech.com
Robotech role-playing games official discussion board at Palladium Books Forums of the Megaverse
Robotech role-playing games at RPG Geek Database
Robotech role-playing games at RPGnet Game Index

Anime OVAs
1987 anime films
Mecha anime and manga
Sentinels, The
Television films as pilots
Television pilots not picked up as a series
1980s English-language films

ja:ロボテック#Robotech II: The Sentinels